The 2009 USA Sevens competition took place on February 14 and 15 at Petco Park in San Diego, California. It was the fourth Cup trophy in the 2008-09 IRB Sevens World Series. The USA Sevens is played annually as part of the IRB Sevens World Series for international rugby sevens. Argentina won the 2009 USA Sevens, defeating England 19–14 in the cup final.

This was the last edition of the USA Sevens to be held in San Diego. Starting with the 2010 edition, the event was moved to Sam Boyd Stadium near Las Vegas.

Teams

Pool stages

Pool A
{| class="wikitable" style="text-align: center;"
|-
!width="200"|Team
!width="40"|Pld
!width="40"|W
!width="40"|D
!width="40"|L
!width="40"|PF
!width="40"|PA
!width="40"|+/-
!width="40"|Pts
|- 
|align=left| 
|3||3||0||0||68||33||+35||9
|-
|align=left| 
|3||2||0||1||57||27||+30||7
|-
|align=left| 
|3||1||0||2||54||46||+8||5
|-
|align=left| 
|3||0||0||3||19||92||-73||3
|}

Pool B
{| class="wikitable" style="text-align: center;"
|-
!width="200"|Team
!width="40"|Pld
!width="40"|W
!width="40"|D
!width="40"|L
!width="40"|PF
!width="40"|PA
!width="40"|+/-
!width="40"|Pts
|- 
|align=left| 
|3||2||0||1||69||21||+48||7
|-
|align=left| 
|3||2||0||1||82||36||+46||7
|-
|align=left| 
|3||1||0||2||50||62||-12||5
|-
|align=left| 
|3||1||0||2||21||103||-82||5
|}

Pool C
{| class="wikitable" style="text-align: center;"
|-
!width="200"|Team
!width="40"|Pld
!width="40"|W
!width="40"|D
!width="40"|L
!width="40"|PF
!width="40"|PA
!width="40"|+/-
!width="40"|Pts
|- 
|align=left| 
|3||3||0||0||72||26||+46||9
|-
|align=left| 
|3||2||0||1||69||39||+30||7
|-
|align=left| 
|3||1||0||2||48||58||-10||5
|-
|align=left| 
|3||0||0||3||31||97||-66||3
|}

Pool D
{| class="wikitable" style="text-align: center;"
|-
!width="200"|Team
!width="40"|Pld
!width="40"|W
!width="40"|D
!width="40"|L
!width="40"|PF
!width="40"|PA
!width="40"|+/-
!width="40"|Pts
|- 
|align=left| 
|3||3||0||0||111||26||+85||9
|-
|align=left| 
|3||2||0||1||77||24||+53||7
|-
|align=left| 
|3||1||0||2||76||55||+21||5
|-
|align=left| 
|3||0||0||3||0||159||-159||3
|}

Knockout

Shield

Bowl

Plate

Cup

Statistics

Individual points

Individual tries

References

External links 
 Official site of tournament organizers
 USA Sevens on irb.com
 IRB Sevens World Series
 USA Sevens on MySpace

Usa
2009 
Sports in San Diego
2009 in American rugby union
2009 in sports in California
2009 rugby sevens competitions